(S)-sulfolactate dehydrogenase ((2S)-3-sulfolactate dehydrogenase, SlcC) is an enzyme with systematic name (2S)-sulfolactate:NAD+ oxidoreductase. This enzyme catalyses the following chemical reaction

 (2S)-3-sulfolactate + NAD+  3-sulfopyruvate + NADH + H+

This bacterial (Chromohalobacter salexigens) enzyme acts on the 3-sulfolactate.

References

External links 
 

EC 1.1.1